The Hockley Valley Resort is a ski retreat, 18 hole championship golf course, conference centre and hotel in Mono, Ontario, Canada. It has 15 runs and four ski lifts.

The town of Mono also has the Hockley Valley Provincial Nature Reserve. The resort, originally a small hotel along with a ski retreat was purchased by Nancy Adamo in 1985 and, in 1986, it underwent a $250 million revamp into a resort, spa and conference centre. By 2000, it employed 250 staff.

The property was previously Hockley Hills Resort. Later, it became Heritage Village Canada, affiliated with Jim Bakker's Heritage USA. Plans were abandoned and it ran independently shortly afterward. Eventually, it became Hockley Valley Resort. In the past it had served as a courthouse, a blacksmith shop and a town hall.

References

External links 
 Official website

Golf clubs and courses in Ontario
Spas
Convention centres in Canada
Buildings and structures in Dufferin County